David Edward Kyvig (March 8, 1944  June 22, 2015) was an American historian, and Distinguished Research Professor at Northern Illinois University.

Life
Kyvig graduated from Kalamazoo College cum laude in 1966, and from Northwestern University with a Ph.D. in 1971. He taught at Kalamazoo College, University of Tromsø, the University of Akron, and Northern Illinois University.

Awards
 2004–2005 Woodrow Wilson International Center for Scholars resident fellow
 1997 Bancroft Prize
 1987–1988 Fulbright Professor of American Civilization

Works

 
   (2nd ed., 2000)
     (Japanese ed., 1999)

 
 
 

"The Unintended Consequences of an Amendment to Ban Gay Marriage", History News Network, 7-12-04
"Past and Present: The Starr Report and Clinton Impeachment", U.S. News & World Report, September 11, 2008

References

2015 deaths
American historians
Kalamazoo College alumni
Northwestern University alumni
Kalamazoo College faculty
Academic staff of the University of Tromsø
University of Akron faculty
Northern Illinois University faculty
Bancroft Prize winners